George Cecil Westropp Bennett (1877 – 20 June 1963) was an Irish  Cumann na nGaedheal and Fine Gael politician from 1927 to 1951.

Biography
He was born in Ballymurphy, his father's estate in County Limerick in 1877. He was the second son of Captain Thomas Westropp Bennett, a British Army officer. His elder brother Thomas Westropp Bennett was a Senator and Cathaoirleach of the Irish Free State Senate as well as serving in the Board of the Irish Agricultural Organisation Society (IAOS) for many years with Sir Horace Plunkett.

George C. Bennett spent several years farming in Canada before returning to Limerick. He became a magistrate, county councillor and vice-chairman of the local hospital committee and was involved in many other charitable projects. A farmer, he was elected to Dáil Éireann as a Cumann na nGaedheal Teachta Dála (TD) at the June 1927 general election for the Limerick constituency. He later joined Fine Gael.

Throughout his time in the Dáil he was renowned as a strong defender of the Agricultural interest. After a redrawing of the boundaries of the Limerick constituency he was not re-elected in the 1948 general election but the Inter Party Government Taoiseach John A. Costello nominated him to the Seanad where he sat until 1951. 

An agricultural and financial expert, he inherited an estate called Rathaney from his sister Jane Bennett; and owing to his financial independence gave all of his parliamentary salary to funding his constituents. He died in June 1963, and was never married. He was an huntsman and breeder of blood stock and pedigree dogs; the Milltown Irish Red Setters are a legacy of his.

His obituary in The Irish Times in 1963 said that he had been "a popular public representative". In an interview in 2008 Liam Cosgrave, said that "in 60 years he never heard a bad word said against Bennett who was held in universally high regard".

References

Sources
Based on the Irish Free State Parliamentary Companion 1932.

1877 births
1963 deaths
Cumann na nGaedheal TDs
Fine Gael TDs
Politicians from County Limerick
Members of the 5th Dáil
Members of the 6th Dáil
Members of the 7th Dáil
Members of the 8th Dáil
Members of the 9th Dáil
Members of the 10th Dáil
Members of the 11th Dáil
Members of the 12th Dáil
Members of the 6th Seanad
20th-century Irish farmers
Nominated members of Seanad Éireann
Fine Gael senators